Antoine Watteau (1684–1721) was French painter.

Watteau may also refer to:

People with the surname
Louis Joseph Watteau (1731–1798), French painter, nephew of Jean-Antoine
François-Louis-Joseph Watteau (1758–1823), French painter, son of Louis Joseph

Other uses
Watteau (train), a Paris-Tourcoing express train 1978–1995
Watteau dress, a stylistic school most influential in the design of gowns and their components

See also
Watteau in Venice, a novel
Watto, a fictional character in the Star Wars universe